Luton Corporation Tramways served the town of Luton in Bedfordshire from 21 February 1908 until 16 April 1932.

History

In 1904, Luton Corporation applied for a Tramways Provisional Order, and this was confirmed and granted in 1905. The corporation issued out the work to competitive tender, and the contract was secured by White & Co on 19 March 1907.

The tramway was constructed in 4½ months, work beginning on 7 October 1907. The total cost, including the 12 tramcars, was £63,000.

The official inauguration took place on 23 February 1908. In 1909 the lease transferred to Balfour, Beatty and Co, and Luton Corporation took over the running of the system some years later.

In 1925, the tramways made a profit of £2,000.

Infrastructure
The complete system opened in 1908, and had five routes originating at the Town Hall:
(Round Green)
 Manchester Street, New Bedford Road to a terminus by Wardown Park at 
 Upper George Street, Dunstable Road to a terminus at the junction with Kingsway at 
(Stockwood)
(Park Town)

Tramcars
The fleet, in a livery of grass green with ivory window frames and rocker panels, consisted of:
 12 open top double deck tramcars, from the United Electric Car Company, each with two 30 h.p. motors. In 1929 five were converted to top covered.
 1 single deck tramcar.

In 1923, a single deck car was purchased from Glasgow Corporation Tramways as an economy measure.

Closure

Towards the end of 1930, the Eastern National Omnibus Company made an offer to purchase the Luton tramways for £64,000. The offer was accepted by the Council on 20 January 1931. On 12 May 1932, the council re-affirmed its decision to sell out to the Eastern National Omnibus Company. However, it was forced to rescind its decision, and eventually decided to operate its own buses in place of the trams.

The tramway system closed on 16 April 1932 and was replaced by the motorbuses of Luton Corporation.

Preserved tramcar
Luton's only single deck tram is being restored, for static display, at Stockwood Discovery Centre.

Uncovered tramlines

On Monday 3 February 2014 a section of road was dug up by contractors during the process of building a new road (to run alongside the current railway lines) at the junction of Old Bedford Road and Midland Road, Luton. Following removal of tarmac and cobblestones a section of single tram line was clearly visible still buried in the road.

References

External links
 Luton Tramcar No 6 (being restored) on the Vintage Carriages Trust website

See also
List of town tramway systems in the United Kingdom

Rail transport in Bedfordshire
Tram transport in England
Transport in Luton/Dunstable Urban Area